Scott Stephen Garland (May 16, 1952 – June 9, 1979) was a Canadian  ice hockey centre who played three seasons in the National Hockey League for the Toronto Maple Leafs and Los Angeles Kings between 1976 and 1978.

Garland played 91 career NHL games, scoring 13 goals and 24 assists for 37 points. Garland died of injuries suffered in an automobile accident on June 9, 1979 after blowing a tire driving in Montreal, Quebec and hitting a wall.

Career statistics

Regular season and playoffs

See also
 List of ice hockey players who died during their playing career

References

"Ex-Leaf killed in car accident" The Globe and Mail; Toronto, Ont. 12 June 1979: P.35.

1952 births
1979 deaths
Accidental deaths in Quebec
Canadian ice hockey centres
Ice hockey people from Saskatchewan
Los Angeles Kings players
Montreal Junior Canadiens players
Oklahoma City Blazers (1965–1977) players
Peterborough Petes (ice hockey) players
Road incident deaths in Canada
Sportspeople from Regina, Saskatchewan
Springfield Indians players
Toronto Maple Leafs players
Tulsa Oilers (1964–1984) players
Undrafted National Hockey League players